is a Japanese football player. He plays for Renofa Yamaguchi FC.

Career
Takeru Kiyonaga joined J2 League club Renofa Yamaguchi FC in 2017.

Club statistics
Updated to 22 February 2018.

References

External links
Profile at Renofa Yamaguchi

1994 births
Living people
Kansai University alumni
Association football people from Yamaguchi Prefecture
Japanese footballers
J2 League players
Renofa Yamaguchi FC players
Association football midfielders